Liliane Taelemans (1938-2018) was the Belgian candidate for the Miss Universe 1958. She was also a presenter in the Flemish show - 100.000 of niets.

References

1938 births
2018 deaths
Belgian beauty pageant winners
Miss Universe 1958 contestants
Belgian women television presenters